This is a list of universities and colleges in Guam. This list also includes other educational institutions providing higher education, meaning tertiary, quaternary, and, in some cases, post-secondary education.

Public institutions

Four-year institutions
University of Guam, Mangilao

Two-year institutions
Guam Community College, Mangilao

Private institutions
Pacific Islands Bible College, Mangilao

See also
Lists of colleges and universities
Lists of colleges and universities by country

External links
Department of Education listing of accredited institutions in Guam

Guam
Guam

Colleges and universities
Colleges and universities